This is a list of heads of government of Ethiopia since the formation of the post of Chief Minister of the Ethiopian Empire in 1909 (renamed to Prime Minister in 1943). Since 1909, there have been 3 chief ministers and 11 prime ministers and one was both chief minister and prime minister, making a total of 15 persons being or having been head of government.

Most of the prime ministers were regular prime ministers, appointed through a regular political process. Some others were acting prime ministers only (indicated in the list below), while others were both acting and regular prime ministers during their term(s). In addition, there is one prime minister who was acting prime minister first, then was regularly appointed and finally served as a caretaker prime minister of an outgoing government: Hailemariam Desalegn. During the 1960 Ethiopian coup d'état attempt, two prime ministers served at the same time, the regular one and an irregular one appointed by the leaders of the coup. Also, there was an interim prime minister after the end of the Ethiopian Civil War.

Since 1995, the prime minister of Ethiopia has not only been the head of government, but also the commander-in-chief of the Ethiopian National Defense Force. The current prime minister, Abiy Ahmed, took office on 2 April 2018.

List

Timeline

See also
Emperor of Ethiopia
List of emperors of Ethiopia
President of Ethiopia
List of presidents of Ethiopia
Prime Minister of Ethiopia
Rulers of Ethiopia

Notes

References

External links
World Statesmen – Ethiopia

Prime Ministers of Ethiopia
Ethiopia

Government of Ethiopia